Neidert is a surname of German origin, being a shortened form of the surname Neidhardt. Notable people with the surname include:

John Neidert (born 1946), American former football linebacker
Nick Neidert (born 1996), American professional baseball pitcher

See also
Neidhardt
Neidhart